Round Pond is a lake located south of Indian Lake, New York. Fish species present in the lake are brown trout, black bullhead, sunfish, and white sucker. Access to the lake via trail from Big Brook Road. No motors are allowed on this lake.

References

Lakes of New York (state)
Lakes of Hamilton County, New York